Palaina edwardi, also known as Edward's staircase snail, is a species of staircase snail that is endemic to Australia's Lord Howe Island in the Tasman Sea.

Description
The globose pupiform shell of adult snails is 3–3.1 mm in height, with a diameter of 1.7 mm, with deeply impressed sutures. It is pale golden-brown in colour, with a white peripheral band on the final whorl and radial streak above the aperture. It has widely spaced axal ribs. The umbilicus is closed. The circular aperture has a strongly reflected lip and an operculum.

Habitat
The snail is rare and only found on the southern mountains of the island.

References

 
edwardi
Gastropods of Lord Howe Island
Taxa named by Tom Iredale
Gastropods described in 1944